Kingsize is the third studio album by English boy band Five. The album was released in the United Kingdom on 27 August 2001, reaching number three on the UK Albums Chart. The album was later released in Australia on 2 December 2001. The album failed to chart in the United States. The album went on to be certified gold in the United Kingdom.

Three singles were released from Kingsize, including the UK Singles Chart-topping Let's Dance and saw the departure of Sean Conlon. This was their last album to be released before reuniting in 2013 for ITV2's The Big Reunion and the last to feature J Brown and Abz Love. They then released an album as a three piece more than 20 years later in 2022.

Background
Despite only being released three months earlier, Kingsize was re-issued in the United Kingdom on 24 December 2001, containing an additional track, "The Heat", as well an enhanced section, featuring music videos and interview clips. The Japanese release of Kingsize features an additional slipcase, as well as the bonus track "1,2,3,4,5", which was issued as the B-side to "Closer to Me" in the United Kingdom. Copies of the album bought at Woolworths stores in the United Kingdom came with an exclusive poster booklet, containing information and facts on the band, as well as a complete chart history and discography. The poster booklet also indicated that a VHS release was planned to be released alongside the album, entitled Kingsize: Behind the Scenes, detailing the recording of the album, featuring interviews with the band, and including the music videos for the lead single, "Let's Dance", and at the time, was planned as the album's second single, "Hear Me Now". However, due to the band's imminent split, "Hear Me Now" was never released as a single, the VHS release was cancelled, and a Greatest Hits compilation was released just three months after the release of Kingsize. The track "Set Me Free", which was recorded during the album sessions, was later issued as an original track on the band's Greatest Hits compilation.

Track listing

Notes
"Lay All Your Lovin' on Me" contains a sample from "Back in Black", performed by AC/DC.
"Rock the Party" contains a sample from the main theme from "Grease".

Personnel
Credits adapted from Kingsizes liner notes.
 Abs Breen — composer, vocals
 Andy Caine – backing vocals
 Ash Howes – mixing, programming
 Ben Chapman – production, mixing, engineering
 Ben Coombs – engineering
 Daniel Pursey – engineering
 Dave Arch – arrangement
 Eliot Kennedy – backing vocals
 Jason "J" Brown - composer, vocals
 Julian Gallagher – arrangement, production
 Martin Harrington – programming
 Matt Howe – engineering
 Richard Stannard – arrangement, production, backing vocals
 Ritchie Neville — composer, vocals
 Robin Sellers – engineering
 Scott Robinson — composer, vocals
 Sean Conlon — composer, vocals
 Sharon Murphy – backing vocals
 Stargate — production, mixing
 Steve Mac – production
 Tim Woodcock – backing vocals

Charts

Weekly charts

Year-end charts

Certifications

Release history

References

2001 albums
Five (band) albums
Albums produced by Stargate
Albums produced by Richard Stannard (songwriter)